Melica tangutorum, is a species of grass found in China (Gansu, Qinghai, Sichuan) and Mongolia.

Description
The species is perennial and caespitose, which is clumped as well. The species leaf-sheaths are tubular and scabrous with one of their length being closed.

It is also interrupted, dense, and secund with scaberulous branches. The panicle branches are capillary and carry distant spikelets. Florets are diminished at the apex.

Both the lower and upper glumes are elliptic, keelless, membranous, and have acute apexes. Palea is elliptic, have scabrous surface and is 2-veined. Flowers are fleshy, oblong, truncate, have 2 lodicules, and grow together.

Ecology
It blooms from August to September.

References

tangutorum
Endemic flora of China
Flora of Asia